Herbert Lewis Hardwick Arroyo (May 2, 1914 – December 27, 1966),  also known as "Cocoa Kid", was a Puerto Rican boxer of African descent who fought primarily as a welterweight but also in the middleweight division. Hardwick won the World Colored Championships in both divisions. He was a member of boxing's "Black Murderers' Row" and fought the best boxers of his time. He was inducted into the International Boxing Hall of Fame in 2012.

Early years
Hardwick was born in the City of Mayaguez, Puerto Rico to Maria Arroyo, a native of Puerto Rico, and Lewis Hardwick, an African American Merchant Marine. In 1913, his father was on leave and left the island without knowing that Maria was pregnant with his child. It was only upon his return several months later, that he found out that he was a father.

The Hardwick family moved to Atlanta, Georgia when he was still a child and his father renamed him "Herbert Lewis Hardwick." Tragedy struck the family when his father and the rest of the crew of the USS Cyclops disappeared during World War I. The loss of the ship and 306 crew and passengers without a trace sometime after March 4, 1918, remains the single largest loss of life in U.S. Naval history not directly involving combat. The cause of the ship's loss is unknown. Hardwick was only four years old.

Shortly thereafter, upon the death of his mother, Hardwick went to live with his maternal aunt Antonia Arroyo-Robinson.  Mrs. Arroyo-Robinson raised Hardwick and he came to identify more with his Puerto Rican heritage.

Boxing career
Hardwick began to box in Atlanta when he was fourteen years old under the tutorship and management of Edward Allen Robinson (Antonia's husband). He fought for the first time as a professional at the age of fifteen, on May 27, 1929, at the Elks' Restaurant, in Atlanta, against a boxer who went under the name of "Kid Moon" and was victorious in that encounter.

In 1932, Connecticut State Senator Harry Durant was among those present at one of his fights in West Palm Beach. The Senator was impressed with Hardwick and sponsored his trip to New Haven where Hardwick began to fight under the name of the "Cocoa Kid." The name printed on his boxing license was that of "Louis Hardwick Arroyo." Hardwick used various names during his boxing career, besides using "Louis Arroyo," he would also fight under the name of "Louis Kid Cocoa". On April 4, 1932, he won his first fight in Connecticut, against a boxer named Joe Miller.

Black Murderers' Row
During his career in the late 1930s and early 1940s, Hardwick fought the top African-American fighters of the era in the Welterweight and Middleweight divisions. This group included, but was not limited to Charley Burley, Holman Williams, Jack Chase, Lloyd Marshall, Bert Lytell, Aaron Wade, and Eddie Booker. Hardwick fought Williams thirteen times, winning eight, losing three, and drawing in two.

The group came to be known as the "Black Murderers' Row" or Murderers' Row and was made up primarily of highly rated African-American boxing contenders in the 1940s, who competed around the Middleweight and Light Heavyweight divisions. Hardwick was the only Hispanic of African descent in the group. Renowned for their toughness and great boxing ability, they were feared throughout the boxing world and were the most avoided fighters of their generation. According to boxing pundit Jim Murray, the Murderers' Row was the most exclusive men's club the ring had ever known. They were so good and so feared that they had to have their own tournament. The term "murderers' row" was coined by writer Budd Schulberg, screenwriter of On the Waterfront.

Amongst the many boxers whom Hardwick fought and defeated during his career were Louis "Kid" Kaplan. The fight occurred on February 2, 1933, at the Arena in New Haven. Kaplan was a champion who held the World Featherweight title until 1927. On December 5, 1933, he faced Lou Ambers and lost the match.

From April through September 1940, Hardwick was the number one welterweight contender in the world. However Henry Armstrong, who held the World Welterweight Championship, refused to give him a title shot. On October 9, 1943, Hardwick made the cover of Knockout Magazine as "The Cocoa Kid."

World Colored Welterweight Championship
The World Colored Welterweight title was created in 1936. On  July 26 of that year, Hardwick met Young Peter Jackson, the holder of the Pacific Coast and Mexican lightweight titles, at Heinemann Park in New Orleans, Louisiana in a 10-round title bout referred by Harry Wills, a three-time World Colored Heavyweight Champ. Hardwick won via a technical knock-out in the second round.

He made four defenses of the title. On September 22 of that year at the same venue, he defeated Jackie Elverillo on points in 10 rounds. On June 11, 1937, at the Coliseum Arena in New Orleans, Hardwick fought his old nemesis Holman Williams, prevailing in a close fight, winning a decision in the 12-rounder. Ring Magazine had donated a championship belt for the bout.

Hardwick successfully defended his title against Black Canadian boxer Sonny Jones at the Valley Arena in Holyoke, Massachusetts on November 15, 1937, in a bout refereed by then former world heavyweight champion Jack Sharkey. Hardwick scored a technical knock out in the sixth round of their 15-round bout. He had devastated Jones in the third with a right to his jaw and with a right opened a cut over Sonny's left eye. Sharkey stopped the fight when Jones could barely see.

The ascension of Henry Armstrong as the world welterweight champ on May 31, 1938 (when he beat Barney Ross) seemingly made the title redundant (the World Colored Heavyweight Championship expired when Joe Louis became world heavyweight champ in 1937 and the World Colored Middleweight Championship became defunct for 10 years after Gorilla Jones lost the world middleweight title in 1932), but continued to be contested during Armstrong's reign.
				
Hardwick lost the title to Charley Burley on August 22, 1938, at Hickey Park in Millvale, Pennsylvania. Burley won a unanimous decision in the 15-round bout, knocking Hardwick to the canvas three times and defeating him decisively, taking his title. Burley never defended the title, probably out of a desire to get a title shot with Armstrong. To fill the vacant title, Hardwick and Holman Williams met in a rematch on January 11, 1940, at the Coliseum in Baltimore, Maryland.

Hardwick won a unanimous decision in their 15-round title bout, winning the title for a second time. Hardwick never defended his second title.

World Colored Middleweight Championship
Hardwick faced Holman Williams for his World Colored Middleweight Championship on January 15, 1943, at the Victory Arena in New Orleans, Louisiana. Hardwick took the title from Williams on points in the 12-round bout.

He never defended the title, which became extinct. Instead, he met Williams at New Orleans' Coliseum Arena on September 15, 1944, for the "Duration Middleweight World Title". This time, the result was a draw after 12 rounds. It was his second fight after being discharged from the U.S. Navy.

The Hardwick – Billy Smith controversy

In 1944, a controversy erupted between Hardwick and a boxer named "Oakland Billy Smith." When the fighters met on November 24, in the Civic Auditorium of San Francisco, California, the betting odds favored the Cocoa Kid over Smith by 2 to 1. When Hardwick was knocked down four times, referee Frankie Brown became suspicious and stopped the fight, declaring it a "no-contest." During an investigation carried out by the California Boxing Commission, Hardwick claimed his poor performance was due to personal anxiety about his "sick mother" (meaning his aunt Antonia). According to the Oakland Tribune, the commission felt that Hardwick threw the fight. In addition to withholding his earnings, the commission fined him $500, and suspended him from boxing for six months.

End of his boxing career
On September 17, 1945, Hardwick fought and lost to Archie Moore. He lost his last professional fight on August 24, 1948, against Bobby Mann at Ball Park in Trenton, New Jersey. In 1949, Sugar Ray Robinson entered into, and then broke, two agreements to fight against Hardwick.

That same year of 1949, Hardwick was Robinson's sparring partner at the welterweight king's training camp in Pompton Lakes, New Jersey. Robinson was training for a fight with Steve Belloise and was at his peak. In one session, Hardwick landed a short overhand right to Robinson's chin and dropped him in the second round.

By the end of his boxing career, Hardwick had fought a total of 244 professional fights, of which he won 176 with 48 knockouts (KO). He lost 56 fights, 7 by way of KOs and 10 of his fights were classified as draws (ties). Among the Champions which he faced during his career were: Louis Kaplan, Johnny Jadick, Lou Ambers, Christopher "Battling" Battalino, Chalky Wright and Archie Moore. Of these he defeated Kaplan, Jadick and Wright in non-title fights.

Later years
After retiring from the ring in 1950, Hardwick found himself homeless and penniless in Chicago.  Marguerite Winrou, his wife, divorced him and gained the custody of their children. According to the Naval Record Management Center in St. Louis, Missouri, Hardwick had served in the United States Navy during World War II. He was honorably discharged after being diagnosed with  pugilistic dementia by military doctors. He kept his diagnosis a secret during his days as a boxer in order to continue boxing.

Due to his long and difficult boxing career, Hardwick suffered from pugilistic dementia in his last years. In 1955, he wrote to the Navy asking for a copy of his discharge papers which he claimed were stolen with his Social Security card and was later admitted to the Veterans Administration Hospital in North Chicago. He died there on December 27, 1966, and is buried in Wood National Cemetery, section 36a, row 11, site 3, located in Milwaukee, Wisconsin. In 2011, Hardwick was inducted to the International Boxing Hall of Fame in 2012.

Professional boxing record

See also

List of Puerto Ricans
Sports in Puerto Rico
African immigration to Puerto Rico
List of Puerto Rican boxing world champions
Find A Grave

Notes

References

External links
 

1914 births
1966 deaths
Burials in Wisconsin
Puerto Rican male boxers
International Boxing Hall of Fame inductees
World colored middleweight boxing champions
World colored welterweight boxing champions
Middleweight boxers
Welterweight boxers
African-American boxers
People from Mayagüez, Puerto Rico
United States Navy sailors
Puerto Rican United States Navy personnel
20th-century African-American sportspeople
African-American United States Navy personnel
African Americans in World War II